Andrew Ham(m)ond may refer to:

Andrew B. Hammond (1848–1934), American lumberman
Andrew Hammond (ice hockey) (born 1988), professional ice hockey goaltender
Sir Andrew Hamond, 1st Baronet (1738–1828), British naval officer
Sir Andrew Hammond (1800 ship)
Sir Andrew Snape Hammond (1802)
Sir Andrew Snape Hamond-Graeme, 3rd Baronet (1811–1874) of the Hamond baronets

See also
Hammond (surname)
Hamond (disambiguation)